Dragan "Dan" Kesa (born November 23, 1971) is a Serbian-Canadian former professional ice hockey player who played in the National Hockey League for the Vancouver Canucks, Dallas Stars, Pittsburgh Penguins and the Tampa Bay Lightning.

Career
Drafted 95th overall by the Canucks in the 1991 NHL Entry Draft, Kesa played 139 regular season games, scoring 8 goals and 22 assists for 30 points and collecting 66 penalty minutes. Previously to the NHL he played for a short period for the Detroit Vipers. Kesa had spells in the Russian Super League for Avangard Omsk and the Austrian Hockey League for the Vienna Capitals before hanging up his skates.

Personal life
Kesa was born in Vancouver, British Columbia. He is the uncle of Milan Lucic who is currently playing in the National Hockey League (NHL) for the Calgary Flames, Jovan Lučić who is a footballer and plays for POFC Botev Vratsa of the  First Professional Football League (Bulgaria), and Nikola Lucic. Kesa resides in Vancouver, British Columbia.

Career statistics

Regular season and playoffs

References

External links
 

1971 births
Living people
Avangard Omsk players
Canadian ice hockey right wingers
Canadian people of Serbian descent
Dallas Stars players
Detroit Vipers players
Hamilton Canucks players
Kalamazoo Wings (1974–2000) players
Manitoba Moose (IHL) players
Pittsburgh Penguins players
Prince Albert Raiders players
Richmond Sockeyes players
Ice hockey people from Vancouver
Springfield Falcons players
Syracuse Crunch players
Tampa Bay Lightning players
Vancouver Canucks draft picks
Vancouver Canucks players
Vienna Capitals players
Canadian expatriate ice hockey players in Russia